Pampa Wasi (Quechua pampa a large plain, wasi house, "plain house", also spelled Pampahuasi) is a  mountain in the Andes of Peru. It is located in the Huánuco Region, Dos de Mayo Province, Marías District.

References

Mountains of Peru
Mountains of Huánuco Region